Phigalia denticulata, the toothed phigalia, is a moth of the  family Geometridae. It is found from Ontario and New York to Florida, west to Texas, north to Missouri. There are also records from Utah.

The wingspan is 30–37 mm for males. The female wings are reduced to tiny (about 2 mm) nubs, making it impossible for them to fly. Adults are on wing from December to April in the south and from late March to April in the north.

The larvae probably feed on the leaves of deciduous trees.

External links
Bug Guide
Images
Moth Guide

Bistonini
Moths described in 1900
Moths of North America